Jaffarpur Kalan is an urban centre located on the south west borders of the National Capital Territory of Delhi.

Overview

The village is situated on the south west boundary of Delhi. The village falls on the way to two important Delhi-Haryana borders, viz. Dhansa Border and Daurala Border. The village falls under the Najafgarh Vidhan Lok Sabha Constituency of West Delhi. Jaffarpur Kalan is an important village in the adjoining villages of the area due to availability of a host of services for them. 

Important institutions of repute present in the area are Rao Tula Ram Hospital, Ch. Brahm Prakash Government Engineering College, Jawahar Navodaya Vidyalaya, Ch. Brahm Prakash Industrial Training Institute, Jaffarpur Kalan Police Station, BSES substation, State Bank of India, and Delhi Government Aided schools.

Rao Tularam Hospital
Rao Tularam hospital is located near the police station in Jaffar Pur and is approachable from Rawta mor of Dhansa Road.

Netaji Subhas University of Technology (West Campus)
CBP Government Engineering College (Hindi: राजकीय अभियांत्रिकी महाविद्यालय), or GEC Jaffarpur was established by the Department of Training and Technical Education, Government of Delhi. The college was named after Ch. Brahm Prakash, the first chief minister of Delhi. The college is country's first engineering college which has been dedicated to Information Technology, founded by Gowtham C and Saravana Kumar N from Tamilnadu. Its campus has now been acquired by Netaji Subhas University of Technology, a state university established by the Government of NCT of Delhi, as its West Campus to run specialised engineering courses since September 2020.

Other important institutions
 Jawahar Navodaya Vidyalaya, Jaffarpur Kalan
 Ch. Brahm Prakash Industrial Training Institute, Jaffarpur Kalan
 State Bank of India, Jaffarpur Kalan
 Delhi Government Aided Sarvodaya Vidyalayas
 Police Station 
 Electrical Power House

References

External links
 JNV Jaffarpur
 GEC Delhi

Villages in South West Delhi district